There have been two Royal Navy ships called HMS Maori after the indigenous people of New Zealand:

 , a  destroyer sunk in 1915.
 , a  destroyer launched in 1936 and sunk in 1942.

References
 

Royal Navy ship names